Boomslang is the first, and to date only album by Johnny Marr + the Healers. It was released in 2003 through Artistdirect and iMusic. The band consisted of drummer for The Who and son of Ringo Starr, Zak Starkey and then former Kula Shaker bassist Alonza Bevan with Marr handling guitars, lead vocals and keyboards. The literal definition of the word "boomslang" is "a venomous, tree-dwelling snake... of tropical and southern Africa". The expression "I got boomslang..." in South Africa means to get caught up in something (like a boomslang snake hanging from a tree.) For example, "I was about to leave work when I got boomslang by a customer who needed something, and had to stay late."

The 2001 single "The Last Ride" – and its B-sides "Need It" and "Long Gone" – were included in the track listing. "Down On the Corner" was also released as a single, promoted by an appearance on The Late Late Show with Craig Kilborn in February 2003. "Bangin' On" was released as a single in 2003 and got to #78 in UK. Its B-sides were non-album tracks "Here It Comes" and "Get Me Wrong".

Promotion
Tracks "Bangin' On" and "The Last Ride" comprised the primary soundtrack for the runway show of American fashion designer Michael Kors for his Fall-Winter 2003-04 collection.  Track "Caught Up" was featured during the show's finale.  The collection, Kors's first outing under Sportswear Holdings Limited, was shown on February 12, 2003 during New York fashion week and met critical acclaim by the fashion press.

Critical reception
Boomslang was met with "mixed or average" reviews from critics. At Metacritic, which assigns a weighted average rating out of 100 to reviews from mainstream publications, this release received an average score of 53 based on 15 reviews.

In a review for Uncut, the release was given two stars out of five, explaining: "Though 'historic' in being the first album of his career as a singing frontman, for those who have bothered to follow Marr's career, Boomslang isn't so extreme a manoeuvre."

In Rolling Stone, Pat Blashill wrote that the album "shimmers with elements of T. Rex and traces of the Stone Roses – it's got all the atmosphere of a great rock record, but not the guts of one". In The Guardian, reviewer Alex Petridis compared the album negatively to Marr's earlier work in the Smiths. Petridis said that the vocals were in tune but they were "devoid of character". The album's lyrics were said to be "from the Gallagher School of Meaningless Twaddle." The review conceded that the album had its moments but was  overall "an opportunity missed..not bad, exactly but nothing to suggest that history should be rewritten".

Track listing

Personnel
Johnny Marr + The Healers

 Johnny Marr – vocals, guitar; synthesizer (tracks 1, 10, 11); organ (track 6); melodica (track 10); producer

Alonza Bevan – bass guitar; electric piano, recorder, backing vocals (track 7)
Zak Starkey – drums; percussion (tracks 2, 3, 6, 7, 9, 11)
Additional personnel
Lee Spencer – synthesizer (tracks 1, 4, 5, 11), effects (track 11)
Liz Bonney – percussion (tracks 4, 5, 11)
Jonni Musgrave – piano (track 3)
Dave Tolan – percussion (track 7)
Damien Foster, Denise Johnson – backing vocals (track 5)
Steve Gerdes – art direction 
Fiona Skinner – design
James Spencer – engineering, mixing
Frank Arkwright – mastering at The Town House
Tom Sheehan – photograph

Charts

References 

2003 debut albums
Johnny Marr albums